"Sun Green" is a song by Neil Young & Crazy Horse from the 2003 album Greendale.  The song is named after a character, played by Sarah White in the accompanying stage show and film.  The song tells the story of Sun's increasing environmental activism, being arrested for possession of marijuana, meeting a young man named Earth Brown and deciding to go to Alaska with him.

References

Neil Young songs
2003 songs
Songs written by Neil Young